St. Joseph's University is a private aided, Jesuit, higher educational institution run by the Karnataka Province of the Society of Jesus in Bangalore, Karnataka, India. It is one of the oldest educational institution in the state of Karnataka with a history of  years. It has been conferred with the award College of Excellence by the University Grants Commission (India). The institution was awarded a rating of  A++ (3.79/4), in the 4th cycle of re-accreditation by the National Assessment and Accreditation Council (NAAC) in 2017. It offers graduate, post-graduate and research education.
St. Joseph's University has around 300 teaching and non-teaching staff and more than 5500 students. The university is located at Langford Road near Richmond Circle, Bengaluru, Karnataka, India.

History

In the year 1854, St. Joseph's was set up by Missions étrangères de Paris (MEP) because of the need to provide education for the small Catholic community comprising about 1000 Europeans and 5000 Indians. Initially the missionaries started St. Joseph's institution as St. Joseph's European High School.

In the year 1882, St Joseph's College was started and was affiliated to the University of Madras as a Second Grade College. In 1926 the University of Madras granted the Institution the status of a First Grade College. On 1 June 1937, the management of the college was transferred to the Society of Jesus. From 1882 to 1937 the college was under the Missions étrangères de Paris. At the time the college consisted of one building, constructed in 1925, accommodating 350 students.

In 1949, following reorganisation of the state of Karnataka, the college was affiliated to Mysore University. In 1967, the college was granted permanent affiliation to Bangalore University. 1972 saw the commerce sections and evening college separated from the main college. In 1982, University Grants Commission recognised the college under 2(f) status of UGC ACT 1956 giving it authority to grant degrees. Further in 1985, University Grants Commission recognised the college under 12(B) of the UGC ACT 1956. In 1986, it became the first affiliated college in Karnataka to offer postgraduate courses. In 1988, it became the first college in Karnataka to get a research center. The college is also one of the early ones to go for NAAC accreditation in 1998 and got a four-star (70–75%).

In 2001 the college moved from the Residency Road campus to new premises in the erstwhile Hostel Campus at the intersection of Langford Road and Lalbagh Road. The pre-university section was separated from the college in 2002 as part of the Karnataka state policy of bifurcation. The college was Accredited by UGC as a college with Potential for Excellence‘ (CPE) on 3 November 2004 and was one of five colleges in Karnataka that was awarded academic autonomy in the year 2005. The second cycle of NAAC Accreditation conferred A‘ level (Score 85.3%)  on 2 February 2006. A commemorative stamp by India Post was released on 1 August 2009. The UGC extended the college's Autonomous Status for the period 2010–2011 to 2015–2016. Yet again the college saw an improvement in its NAAC Accreditation score in the third Cycle with 'A' level and a score of 3.73/4 on 10 March 2012. The college was granted College for Excellence‘(CE) status by the UGC in 2014. It was granted the status of DST-FIST college in 2015.  The UGC once again extended the  Autonomous Status for the period 2016–2022. In 2014 the college was cited for its model library facility. 

In February 2021, St. Joseph's University bill was presented in the Karnataka Legislative Assembly and was subsequently passed by the Legislative Assembly and Karnataka Legislative Council. The college received its University charter on 2nd July 2022. On 27th September 2022, the institution was inaugurated as India's first public-private University by the President of India, Droupadi Murmu.

The institution has five main campuses, located in the centre of the Cantonment.
 St. Joseph's College, Bangalore  (previously St. Joseph's College of Arts and Sciences)
 St. Joseph's Evening College, Bangalore
 St. Joseph's College of Commerce 
 St. Joseph’s Institute of Management
 St Joseph's College of Law

St. Joseph's also has two high schools and a stand alone pre-university college.
 St. Joseph's Pre-University College
 St Joseph's Boys' High School
 St. Joseph's Indian High School

St. Joseph's Evening College (Autonomous)

St Joseph's Evening College, Bangalore was established in 1972 as a Jesuit college to empower the underprivileged sectors of Indian society  In 2005, it was given autonomous status by the UGC, to devise its own curriculum.

The Evening College is a minority institution and accepts students of all religious denominations without discrimination. It is affiliated to Bengaluru City University and offers three-year BCom, BA, BCA, and BBM degrees and two-year postgraduate degrees in Commerce (MCom), and English.

St. Joseph's College of Commerce (Autonomous)

St. Joseph's College was divided in 1972, and commerce section of the college was spun off to Brigade Road while the Arts and Science section remained at Residency Road. The commerce college later split into St Joseph's College of Business Administration (SJCBA).

St. Joseph's Institute of Management

St. Joseph's Institute of Management (SJIM) is a graduate school of business located in Bangalore. It offers a two-year full-time PGDM program and PhD program from the University of Mysore. It is approved by All India Council for Technical Education, New Delhi.

St. Joseph's College of Law

St. Joseph's College of Law is a law school in Bangalore which was founded in 2017. It is affiliated to Karnataka State Law University, Hubballi, and approved by the Bar Council of India in New Delhi.

META- The Josephite Festival of Literature

The annual Literature festival organised by the Department of English of St. Joseph`s College, Bangalore is open to all college students and the general public. Consisting of a plethora of contests, events, talks, panels and performances, META  has been a platform to showcase new talents in the college and the city. It began before a decade and has already seen ten editions.

Notable alumni
Arts and Science College
Vijoo Krishnan, Author, Secretariat committee member of Comminist Party of India (Marxist)
Kenneth Anderson
Sri. T.S. Krishnamurthy 
Sri Sri Ravi Shankar
Dino Morea
Irfan Razack
Prakash Raj

Commerce College:
 Rahul Dravid, cricket player and coach
 T.V. Mohandas Pai, Chairman of Manipal Global Education 
 Shivil Kaushik, cricketer, Gujarat Lions
 Noyonita Lodh, Miss Diva Universe 2014
 Prakash Raj, actor
 Ramya, actress and politician
 Vinay Rajkumar, actor
 Amritha Aiyer, actress
 Salil Shetty, Secretary-General of Amnesty International
 Devdutt Padikkal, Cricket Player

See also
 List of Jesuit sites
St Joseph's Institute of Management

References

External links
 

Colleges in Bangalore
Jesuit universities and colleges in India
Educational institutions established in 1882
Colleges affiliated to Bangalore University
Academic institutions formerly affiliated with the University of Madras
1882 establishments in India